Calwelliidae is a family of bryozoans belonging to the order Cheilostomatida.

Genera:
 Calwellia Wyville Thomson, 1858
 Ichthyaria Busk, 1884
 Ijimaiellia Gordon, 2009
 Malakosaria Goldstein, 1882
 Onchoporella Busk, 1884
 Onchoporoides Ortmann, 1890
 Wrigiana Gordon & d'Hondt, 1997

References

Cheilostomatida